The list of macaws includes 19 species of macaws including extinct and critically endangered species, and does not include several hypothetical extinct species that have been proposed based on very little evidence.

Species in taxonomic order

Anodorhynchus

The three well-established species in the genus Anodorhynchus are monotypic:

Cyanopsitta

Ara

Orthopsittaca

Primolius

Diopsittaca

References

See also
List of parrots
List of Amazon parrots
Macaws

Macaws